Kceibya is a small town and rural commune in Sidi Slimane Province, Rabat-Salé-Kénitra, Morocco. At the time of the 2004 census, the commune had a total population of 23,218 people living in 3295 households. It lies along the road from Sidi Yahya El Gharb to
Sidi Slimane.

References

Populated places in Sidi Slimane Province
Rural communes of Rabat-Salé-Kénitra